Andreas, pen name for Andreas Martens, born January 3, 1951, in Weißenfels (Germany). Martens studied in Düsseldorf at the  
Academy of Fine Arts and at the St. Luc comics school in Belgium, assisting Eddy Paape on Udolfo, before relocating to France.

He made his debut in the magazines (À suivre), Le Journal de Tintin and Heavy Metal. In 2001 he won de Prix Bonnet d’âne at the comic festival Quai des Bulles in Saint-Malo (France) for his entire oeuvre. This includes that he may draw the poster for the next festival.

His genre series include Arq, Cromwell Stone, Cyrrus, Rork and its spin-off, Capricorne, as well as a number of single works such as La Caverne du Souvenir (The Cave of Memory), Coutoo, Dérives (Adrift), Aztèques, and Révélations Posthumes (Posthumous Revelations).

Comic books by Andreas

Cromwell Stone
 Cromwell Stone (1986)
 Le retour de Cromwell Stone (1994)
 Le testament de Cromwell Stone (2004)

Cyrrus
 Cyrrus (1984)
 Mil (1987)

Capricorne

1. L'Objet (1996)
2. Electricité (1996)
3. Deliah (1997)
4. Le cube numérique (1998)
5. Le secret (1999)
6. Attaque (2001)
7. Le Dragon bleu (2002)
8. Tunnel (2003)
9. Le passage (2004)
10. Les Chinois (2005)

11. Patrick (2006)
12. --No Title-- (2007)
13. Rêve en cage (2008)
14. L'Operation (2009)
15. New York (2011)
16. Vu de près (2012)
17. Les Cavaliers (2013)
18. Zarkan (2014)
19. Terminus (2015)
20. Maître (2017)

Rork

0. Les fantômes (2012)
1. Fragments (1984)
2. Passages (1983)
3. Le cimetière de cathédrales (1988)
4. Lumière d'étoile (1988)

5. Capricorne (1990)
6. Descente (1992)
7. Retour (1993)
8. Les oubliés (2002)

Arq

1.  Ailleurs (1997)
2.  Mémoires 1 (1998)
3.  Mémoires 2 (1999)
4.  Racken (2000)
5.  White Dust (2001)
6.  Réveil (2002)

7.  Dorro Zengu (2003)
8.  Retrouvailles (2005)
9.  Feu Croisé (2006)
10. Tehos (2007)
11. Maître noir (2008)
12. Mission (2009)

13. Détectives (2010)
14. Intrus (2011)
15. Lune (2012)
16. Rêves 1(2013)
17. Rêves 2 (2014)
18. Ici (2015)

Mobilis
(With Christian Durieux)
 Heurts (2000)
 Seconde Chance (2001)
 Manipulations minutieuses (2002)

Books about Andreas
 Yves Lacroix et Philippe Sohet (dir.), Andreas. Une Monographie, Mosquito, 1997
 Yves Lacroix et Philippe Sohet, L'Ambition narrative. Parcours dans l'œuvre d'Andreas, Éditions XYZ, 1999

References

External links
 Dossier of Andreas
 bdandreas
 Interview by ZozoLala (Andreas prefers not to explain everything)

1951 births
German comics artists
Living people
People from Weißenfels
German comics writers
German male writers